Christian Hellberg (born 1972) is a Swedish chef and co-author of the cookbook Flavours from Fjällbacka, along with his childhood friend Camilla Läckberg. Many know him from 'Dinner Secrets from the Abbey,' in which he participated several times; in the spring of 2008 he was one of the two chefs who competed against each other in 'Chefs Duel.' Chefs duel is a big favorite-under the direction of chef Erik Brännström friends or colleagues compete for who is "best" in the kitchen; each team must cook in the evening and present an appetizer, main course and dessert. Hellberg has cooked for events for the annual Nobel Peace Prize awards, such as banquets.

Career
Restaurant Fredsgatan 12, which Hellberg has a strong connection with, is located in the Royal Academy of Arts buildings, a cultural monument opposite Rosenbad in Stockholm. Hellberg is also host of the TV program 'Grill!' and was named 'Chef of the Year' in 2001. Since autumn 2009 he is head chef at Restaurant Curman, located in historic Sturebadet in Stockholm; an historic establishment imagined and realized by the turn of the century's passionate health guru Carl Curman. In the spa/restaurant, which today bears Curman's name, around the Old Norse carvings, chef Hellberg has invites to a private yet refreshing experience. Since 2011, Hellberg has worked as a guide to Swedish television cooking programmes with not inconsiderable success; yet another adjunct as well is our Fjällbacka originating friends work for Trädgår'n: a spacious restaurant, bar and nightclub that has a summer terrace backing onto the Trädgårdsföreningen park. Hellberg takes the humble baked potato to new heights with caviare plus smoked mayonnaise on his tv4 slot.

References

Further reading

External links

 YouTube clip

1972 births
Living people
Swedish chefs